Curling at the 2009 Winter Universiade took place from February 18 to 27 at the Heilongjiang Skating Gym in Harbin, China.

Qualification
WCF announced a new qualification system for member associations into the 2009 Winter Universiade. Points shall be awarded, commencing with 2007 Winter Universiade in Torino, Italy and continuing through the World Junior Curling Championships (men's and women's) and World Curling Championships (men's and women's).

Men

Women

Men

Teams

Round-robin standings

Round-robin results

Draw 1
Thursday, February 19, 14:00

Draw 2
Friday, February 20, 9:00

Draw 3
Friday, February 20, 19:00

Draw 4
Saturday, February 21, 14:00

Draw 5
Sunday, February 22, 9:00

Draw 6
Sunday, February 22, 19:00

Draw 7
Monday, February 23, 14:00

Draw 8
Tuesday, February 24, 9:00

Draw 9
Tuesday, February 24, 19:00

Tiebreaker
Wednesday, February 25, 9:00

Playoffs

Semifinals
Thursday, February 26, 9:00

Bronze Medal Game
Thursday, February 26, 14:00

Gold Medal Game
Friday, February 27, 14:00

Women

Teams

Round-robin standings

Round-robin results

Draw 1
Thursday, February 19, 9:00

Draw 2
Thursday, February 19, 19:00

Draw 3
Friday, February 20, 14:00

Draw 4
Saturday, February 21, 9:00

Draw 5
Saturday, February 21, 19:00

Draw 6
Sunday, February 22, 14:00

Draw 7
Monday, February 23, 9:00

Draw 8
Monday, February 23, 19:00

Draw 9
Thursday, February 24, 14:00

Tiebreaker
Wednesday, February 25, 9:00

Playoffs

Semifinals
Thursday, February 26, 9:00

Bronze Medal Game
Thursday, February 26, 14:00

Gold Medal Game
Friday, February 27, 9:00

References

External links

2009 Winter Universiade
Winter Universiade
2009